Sylvester is the county seat of Worth County, Georgia, United States. The population was 6,188 at the 2010 and at 5,865 (2019) census.  The city is the county seat and business center of Worth County and is claimed to be the Peanut Capital of the World due to its peanut production.

History
Sylvester was platted in 1893. The Georgia General Assembly incorporated Sylvester as a town in 1898.

Geography
Sylvester is located at  (31.531425, -83.836233).

Sylvester is located on  U.S. Highway 82 at the junction of  Georgia State Route 33. Georgia State Route 256 enters into southeast Sylvester, where it is co-designated Martin Luther King Jr. Drive.

Demographics

2020 census

As of the 2020 United States census, there were 5,644 people, 2,346 households, and 1,709 families residing in the city.

2000 census
As of the census of 2000, there were 5,990 people, 2,151 households, and 1,537 families residing in the city. The racial makeup of the city was 39.15% White, 59.97% African American, 0.10% Native American, 0.12% Asian, 0.02% Pacific Islander, 0.37% from other races, and 0.28% from two or more races. Hispanic or Latino of any race were 0.90% of the population.

There were 2,151 households, out of which 37.9% had children under the age of 18 living with them, 39.5% were married couples living together, 27.3% had a female householder with no husband present, and 28.5% were non-families. 24.9% of all households were made up of individuals, and 12.2% had someone living alone who was 65 years of age or older.  The average household size was 2.71 and the average family size was 3.27.

In the city, the population was spread out, with 31.5% under the age of 18, 9.0% from 18 to 24, 26.1% from 25 to 44, 19.2% from 45 to 64, and 14.2% who were 65 years of age or older.  The median age was 32 years. For every 100 females, there were 80.1 males.  For every 100 females age 18 and over, there were 72.2 males.

The median income for a household in the city was $24,114, and the median income for a family was $33,707. Males had a median income of $29,010 versus $21,250 for females. The per capita income for the city was $14,387.  About 24.6% of families and 27.1% of the population were below the poverty line, including 33.5% of those under age 18 and 29.0% of those age 65 or over.

Economy
Sylvester is continuing to modernize and grow. Downtown storefronts are occupied and there are several ongoing downtown revitalization projects. Sylvester's progressive changes include an ongoing fiber optic project linking all of the county's schools with high-speed internet. It is also revitalizing the street scape, the courthouse, and other sites of beauty that include City Hall, the Woolard Hotel Apartments, and the start of the 20th century homes located on Isabella Street.

Arts and culture
The Peanut Festival is an annual festival held on the third weekend of October in T.C. Jeffords Park to celebrate the city's status as Peanut Capital of the World. The event is sponsored by the Sylvester/Worth Chamber of Commerce and ConAgra Foods, makers of Peter Pan peanut butter. Activities include one of the largest parades in the southeast and a beauty pageant with up to 100 contestants. Craftsmen from all over the state come to Sylvester to showcase their creations at the festival. Live entertainment and carnival attractions are usually on hand as well.

Education 
The Worth County School District holds pre-school to grade twelve, and consists of two elementary schools, a middle school, and a high school. The district has 296 full-time teachers and over 4,354 students.
Worth County Elementary School
Worth County Primary School
Worth County Middle School
Worth County High School

Notable people

 Marion Butts - NFL running back who played for the San Diego Chargers, New England Patriots, and Houston Oilers; born in Sylvester.
 Rickey Claitt - NFL running back who played for the Washington Redskins; born in Sylvester.
 Mary Hood - award-winning author of How Far She Went, And Venus Is Blue and Familiar Heat.  Graduated from Worth County High School.
 Ray Jenkins - Newspaper editor and deputy press secretary to President Jimmy Carter; born in Sylvester.
 Sue Monk Kidd - author of the New York Times bestseller, The Secret Life of Bees and The Mermaid Chair. Born in Sylvester.
 Frank Park - Congressman (1913-1935)
 Bob Sikes - U.S. Representative for Florida, born in Isabella.
 Sonny Skinner - PGA golf pro.
 Michael Carter - Musician, Songwriter, Producer (Lead guitarist for Luke Bryan), graduated from Worth County High School.

References

External links
 
 City of Sylvester Georgia Portal style website, government, business, library, recreation and more
 Worth County Schools Home Page
 City-Data.com Comprehensive Statistical Data and more about Sylvester

Cities in Georgia (U.S. state)
Cities in Worth County, Georgia
County seats in Georgia (U.S. state)
Albany metropolitan area, Georgia